Neckeropsis is a genus of plant in the family Neckeraceae.

Species
The genus Neckeropsis contains the following species: 

Neckeropsis acutata 
Neckeropsis afrovictoriae 
Neckeropsis amazonica 
Neckeropsis andamana 
Neckeropsis auriculata 
Neckeropsis beccariana 
Neckeropsis boiviniana 
Neckeropsis boniana 
Neckeropsis calcicola 
Neckeropsis calcutensis 
Neckeropsis caudifrondea 
Neckeropsis chevalieri 
Neckeropsis crinita 
Neckeropsis cyclophylla 
Neckeropsis darjeelingensis 
Neckeropsis disticha  (neckeropsis moss)
Neckeropsis exserta 
Neckeropsis fimbriata 
Neckeropsis fleischeri 
Neckeropsis foveolata 
Neckeropsis gracilenta 
Neckeropsis gracilis 
Neckeropsis hookeriacea 
Neckeropsis inundata 
Neckeropsis lentula 
Neckeropsis lepineana 
Neckeropsis liliana 
Neckeropsis madecassa 
Neckeropsis microtheca 
Neckeropsis moutieri 
Neckeropsis nanodisticha 
Neckeropsis nitidula 
Neckeropsis obtusata 
Neckeropsis pabstiana 
Neckeropsis parishiana 
Neckeropsis persplendida 
Neckeropsis pervilleana 
Neckeropsis platyantha 
Neckeropsis pocsii 
Neckeropsis pusilla 
Neckeropsis schnyderi 
Neckeropsis scrobiculata 
Neckeropsis semperiana 
Neckeropsis serrophila 
Neckeropsis spurio-truncata 
Neckeropsis subdisticha 
Neckeropsis submarginata 
Neckeropsis subtruncata 
Neckeropsis takahashii 
Neckeropsis touwii 
Neckeropsis truncata 
Neckeropsis undulata  (undulate neckeropsis moss)
Neckeropsis uruguensis 
Neckeropsis villae-ricae

References

Neckeraceae
Moss genera
Taxonomy articles created by Polbot